Mahamandaleshwar Swami Shankarananda (born Russell Kruckman in 1942) is an American-born yoga guru in the lineage of Bhagavan Nityananda of Ganeshpuri. Swami Shankarananda is the author of several books on meditation and the philosophy and practice of Kashmir Shaivism.  He emphasises spiritual practice (Sadhana), especially meditation, mantra and Self-inquiry. In Australia he founded a residential spiritual school (Shiva Ashram) in Australia, now called The Ashram Mount Eliza where about 20 seekers live and members of the wider public visit for programs, retreats and courses. Since 2015, there have been repeated allegations of coercive "secret sexual relations" between Shankarananda and women in the ashram community.

Biography 

Russell Michael Kruckman was the son of artist Herbert ("Herb") (1904–1998) and school teacher Selma (1908–1998). He studied at Columbia University, New York, where he played on Columbia's US Champion intercollegiate chess team. In 1970 he went to India where he met his guru, Muktananda, the disciple of Bhagavan Nityananda of Ganeshpuri.

In 1991, as Shankarananda, he founded the residential Shiva Ashram on the Mornington Peninsula in Australia. He has held events with other teachers in his lineage and, in 2009, launched a website that documents the gurus Nityananda and Muktananda. He has participated in interfaith events. He was the patron of the Hindu Community Council of Victoria (HCCV), and he spoke at the Parliament of the World's Religions held in Melbourne, 2009.

Shankarananda came into contact with Kashmir Shaivism through his teacher, Muktananda. He teaches the "Shiva Process of Self-Inquiry, an inner dialogue in which students ask precise questions of the Self," realizing their true Self as pure consciousness or awareness. Muktananda emphasised the importance of a self-realised guru who can awaken and guide the kundalini energy of a seeker.

Alleged abuses 

In 2015, newspapers began reporting on allegations of coercive "secret sexual relations" between Shankarananda and women in the ashram community. Shankarananda apologised, claiming that he'd not considered the ramifications of his sexual 'tantric' practices. Yoga Australia suspended its accreditation of Shiva Ashram programs, and the organization went into liquidation. Shankaranda resigned as director but remained as spiritual head, as well as retaining the main ashram property. The property is now called The Ashram Mount Eliza, and as of 2022 Shankarananda continues to run regular programs for residents and the public.

In February 2021, the Australian journalist Dan Oakes published the results of his investigation into the allegations against Kruckman, recording multiple allegations of sexual misconduct and abusive behaviour.

Works 
 Happy for No Good Reason, Information Australia, Melbourne, 2000. 
 Consciousness Is Everything: The Yoga of Kashmir Shaivism, Shaktipat Press, Melbourne, 2003. 
 Carrot in My Ear: Questions and Answers on Living with Awareness, Shaktipat Press, Melbourne, 2004. 
 Self-Inquiry: Using Your Awareness to Unblock Your Life, Shaktipat Press, Melbourne, 2008. 
 Ganeshpuri Days: Memoirs of a Western Yogi,'' Shaktipat Press, Melbourne, 2019.

References 

1942 births
20th-century American Jews
20th-century Hindu religious leaders
21st-century Hindu religious leaders
Converts to Hinduism
Living people
Shaivite religious leaders
Australian Hindus
21st-century American Jews